Shenbakkam is a small locality adjoining with Konavattam locality and also zone-4 headquarters of Vellore Municipal Corporation in the Indian state of Tamil Nadu. Famous Swayambu Vinayagar Temple is located here.

Shri Raghavendra Swami Mrithika Brindavana also referred as "Dhakshina Nava Brindavana" is located here. In 1991, 8 (eight) Moola Brindavanams which were buried under were unearthed and renovated. And with the establishment of the Mrithika Brindhavanam of Sri Raghavendra Swamy, it came to be called (Dhakshina) Nava Brindavana. Sri Madhwacharya had written grantha for Vishnusahasrama in this kshethra. Sri Vyasaraja had installed mukyaprana deity in this temple and Sri Raghavendra Swamy had stayed and meditated here for 14 days.

Demographics
 India census, Shenbakkam had a population of 13,459. Males constitute 50% of the population and females 50%. Shenbakkam has an average literacy rate of 72%, higher than the national average of 59.5%: male literacy is 79%, and female literacy is 65%. In Shenbakkam, 12% of the population is under 6 years of age.

References

Neighbourhoods in Vellore